Stadion Centralny im. Bronisława Malinowskiego, also known as Stadion Miejski w Grudziądzu, is a football stadium in Grudziądz, Poland. The stadium is used by Olimpia Grudziądz.

References

External links
 Statistics and information 

Grudziądz
Sport in Grudziądz
Grudziądz